Şaban Yıldırım (born 25 January 1970) is a retired Turkish football defender and later manager.

References

1970 births
Living people
Turkish footballers
Sakaryaspor footballers
Denizlispor footballers
Bursaspor footballers
Dardanelspor footballers
Association football defenders
Turkish football managers
Sakaryaspor managers
Samsunspor managers
Sarıyer S.K. managers